Chad Daniel Huffman (born April 29, 1985) is an American former professional baseball outfielder and first baseman. He played in Major League Baseball (MLB) for the New York Yankees and St. Louis Cardinals, and in Nippon Professional Baseball (NPB) for the Chiba Lotte Marines.

Career

Amateur
Huffman attended Elkins High School in Missouri City, Texas, and Texas Christian University (TCU), where he played for the TCU Horned Frogs' baseball team from 2004 to 2006 and football team from 2003 to 2005.  With the baseball team, he was named to the All-Conference USA Tournament Team in both 2004 and 2005. In 2005, he played collegiate summer baseball with the Falmouth Commodores of the Cape Cod Baseball League.

San Diego Padres
The San Diego Padres selected Huffman in the second round, with the 53rd overall selection, of the 2006 Major League Baseball draft. Huffman won the 2009 AAA Home Run Derby in PGE Park as a member of the hometown Portland Beavers.

Huffman was waived by the Padres prior to the 2010 season to make room on the 40 man roster for Matt Stairs.

New York Yankees
He was claimed off waivers by the Yankees.

On June 13, 2010, the New York Yankees recalled Huffman to replace the injured Marcus Thames. Prior to the call up, Huffman hit .279 with 5 home runs, 22 RBIs, and an on-base percentage of .344 over 190 at bats with the Triple-A Scranton/Wilkes-Barre Yankees. On June 13, 2010 Huffman had his first career hit in his first Major League at bat.

Huffman was designated by assignment by the Yankees on September 15.

Cleveland Indians
On September 17, he was claimed by the Cleveland Indians and optioned to the Triple-A Columbus Clippers. Huffman was removed from the 40-man roster on November 3 and sent outright to Columbus.

Chiba Lotte Marines
On December 14, 2013 Huffman signed a one-year deal with the Chiba Lotte Marines in Japan's Nippon Professional Baseball. During the 2014 season, Huffman batted .270 with 20 doubles, four home runs and 28 RBIs in 67 games. He also spent the 2015 season with Chiba Lotte.

Detroit Tigers
On December 30, 2015, Huffman signed a minor league contract with the Detroit Tigers. On March 28, 2018, Huffman became a free agent.

St. Louis Cardinals
On November 18, 2016, Huffman signed a minor league deal with the St. Louis Cardinals that included an invitation to spring training.

The Cardinals promoted Huffman to the major leagues on June 7, 2017. On June 13, he hit a triple against the Milwaukee Brewers as a pinch hitter to garner his first major league hit since 2010.

On July 25, 2017, he was outrighted and given unconditional release.

Washington Nationals
On July 27, 2017, he signed a minor league deal with the Washington Nationals. He elected free agency on November 6, 2017.

Second Stint with Tigers
Huffman signed a minor league contract with the Detroit Tigers on November 25, 2017. The deal includes an invitation to the Tigers' 2018 spring training camp. He elected free agency on November 3, 2018.

Awards and honors
 2004 All-Conference USA Tournament Team
 2004 C-USA Freshman of the Year 
 2004 Louisville Slugger Freshman All-American
 2005 Louisville Slugger Second-Team Pre-season All-American
 2005 All-Conference USA Tournament Team
 2005 2nd-team all-Conference C-USA
 2006 NCBWA preseason second-team All-American
 2006 Louisville Slugger Third-Team All-American
 2006 NCBWA 3rd team All-American
 2006 Rivals.com Honorable Mention All-America
 2006 Northwest League Player of the Week
 2006 Northwest League Post-Season All-Star
 2006 Baseball America Short-Season All-Star
 2007 California League Mid-Season All-Star
 2008 Texas League Mid-Season All-Star
 2008 Arizona Fall League Rising Stars
 2009, 2018 AAA Home Run Derby winner
 2010 Inducted into the Elkins HS Baseball Hall of Fame

Personal
He is the son of Debbie and Royce Huffman (TCU Horned Frogs football player 1969–73), and has two older brothers, Royce Jr., an all-conference performer in TCU Horned Frogs football and TCU Horned Frogs baseball from 1995 to 1999, and Scott, who played football and baseball at Rice University from 1998 to 2002.

References

External links

1985 births
American expatriate baseball players in Japan
Baseball players from Texas
Chiba Lotte Marines players
Columbus Clippers players
Eugene Emeralds players
Falmouth Commodores players
Fort Wayne Wizards players
Lake Elsinore Storm players
Leones del Caracas players
American expatriate baseball players in Venezuela
Living people
Major League Baseball left fielders
Memphis Redbirds players
New York Yankees players
Nippon Professional Baseball outfielders
People from Houston
Peoria Saguaros players
Phoenix Desert Dogs players
Portland Beavers players
San Antonio Missions players
Scranton/Wilkes-Barre Yankees players
St. Louis Cardinals players
Syracuse Chiefs players
TCU Horned Frogs baseball players
TCU Horned Frogs football players
Toledo Mud Hens players
Toros del Este players
American expatriate baseball players in the Dominican Republic